IV liga Pomerania group (pl. grupa pomorska) is one of the groups of IV liga, the 5th level of Polish football league system. The league was created in season 2000-01 after introducing new administrative division of Poland. Until the end of the 2007-08 season, IV liga was 4th tier of league system, but this changed with the formation of the Ekstraklasa as the top level league in Poland.

In this group compete football clubs from Pomeranian Voivodeship. The winner of the league is promoted to III liga group II. The bottom teams are relegated to their respective regional groups of Liga okręgowa.

Season 2000-01

Season 2001-02

Relegation play-offs 

|}

Season 2002-03

Relegation play-offs 

|}

Season 2003-04

Relegation play-offs 

|}

Season 2004-05

Relegation play-offs 

|}

Season 2005-06

Relegation play-offs 

|}

Season 2006-07

Relegation play-offs 

|}

Season 2007-08  
2007-08 was the last season with IV liga as fourth level. In the following season IV liga became fifth level, due to creation of Ekstraklasa.

Relegation play-offs

Semifinals

Final

Season 2008-09  
2008-09 was the first season with IV liga as fifth level.

Relegation play-offs 

|}

Season 2009-10

Season 2010-11

Season 2011-12

Season 2012-13

Season 2013-14

Season 2014-15

Season 2015-16

Season 2016-17

Season 2017-18

Season 2018-19

Season 2019-20 

Competition could not be completed due to COVID-19 pandemic. The Pomeranian Football Association decided that first place will be promoted to III liga, but there will be no relegations in 2019-20 season in IV liga Pomerania. Despite that, Lipniczanka Lipnica decided to play next season in Liga Okręgowa, one level below IV liga.

Play-offs for IV liga

Season 2020-21

Regular season

Championship Group

Relegation Group

Play-offs for IV liga

Season 2021-22

Regular season

Championship Group

Relegation Group

Season 2022-23 

Table actual as of 13th December 2022.

References

Football_leagues_in_Poland
Pomeranian_Voivodeship